Kinugawa Line are names of two railway lines that serves Kinugawa hot spring resort area in Tochigi Prefecture of Japan. It may refer to: 
Railway Lines
Japan
Tōbu Kinugawa Line.
Yagan Railway Aizu Kinugawa Line.